Kurt Haverbeck (22 February 1899 – 16 March 1988) was a German field hockey player who competed in the 1928 Summer Olympics.

He was a member of the German field hockey team, which won the bronze medal. He played two matches as forward.

External links
 
profile

1899 births
1988 deaths
Field hockey players at the 1928 Summer Olympics
German male field hockey players
Olympic bronze medalists for Germany
Olympic field hockey players of Germany
Olympic medalists in field hockey
Medalists at the 1928 Summer Olympics